Tri-Village High School is a public high school in New Madison, Ohio, the only one in the district.  It is a consolidation of New Madison School District and the Westmont School District.  The Tri-Village School District started with the 1972–73 school year.  Prior to the consolidation between New Madison and Westmont to form Tri-Village, Westmont had been a consolidation between Hollansburg and Palestine.  Because of community support for the school, recently it has been renovated and expanded.  The school is housed all on one campus. The school announced in 2015 that it will add football.

Boys Basketball
In 1954, Westmont's boys basketball team participated in the OHSAA Boys "Class B" Final Four in Cleveland.

In 1991, the Tri-Village boys basketball team finished as Division IV state runners-up, losing to St. Henry.

In 2014, the boys team participated in the OHSAA Boys Division IV Final Four in Columbus, Ohio, losing to Convoy Crestview. The following season, Tri-Village returned to the state Final Four. They defeated New Philadelphia Tuscarawas Central Catholic, 55–47, giving the Patriots their second state championship game berth. Within the 2015 OHSAA Division IV Boys Basketball State Championship, they then triumphed over Canal Winchester Harvest Preparatory School, 48–46, winning on a made shot by Colton Linkous with 3.3 seconds remaining in the game. The team finished with a perfect 30–0 season, and the school's first state championship title.

Ohio High School Athletic Association State Championships
 Boys Basketball – 2015
 Girls Basketball – 2023

Notable alumni
 Clayton Murphy—2016 Olympic Bronze Medalist (Athletics, 800-meter run)

Notes and references

External links
 District Website

High schools in Darke County, Ohio
Public high schools in Ohio